Pluto 3D is the reissue of American rapper and singer Future's debut studio album Pluto (2012). It was released on November 27, 2012, seven months after its parent album, by A1 Recordings, Freebandz Entertainment and Epic Records. Pluto 3D features three newly recorded songs and two official remixes. During the following week of the re-release, Pluto rose to number 75 on the US Billboard 200, selling 11,000 copies.

Singles 
"Neva End" was officially remixed, featuring a guest appearance from American singer Kelly Rowland. The song was produced by Mike WiLL Made It, and was released as Pluto 3D'''s lead single. Future premiered the song on October 16, 2012, and it was sent to rhythmic radio on December 4, 2012. The song debuted at number 99 on US Billboard Hot 100 and it later peaked at number 52.

 Promotion 
On November 21, 2012, the music video for "Neva End (Remix)" premiered on 106 & Park. On November 27, 2012, Future performed the song along with Kelly Rowland on Jimmy Kimmel Live!'', and later returned to perform "Turn On the Lights".

Track listing

Notes
 signifies a co-producer

Release history

References 

2012 albums
Future (rapper) albums
Reissue albums
Albums produced by Nard & B
Albums produced by Mike Will Made It
Albums produced by Organized Noize
Albums produced by Sonny Digital
Albums produced by Honorable C.N.O.T.E.
Albums produced by Juicy J